3 Américas is a 2007 Argentine–American drama film written and directed by Cristina Kotz Cornejo. The film was produced by Cristina Kotz Cornejo and Angela Counts. The story takes place in Boston, Massachusetts and Buenos Aires, Argentina.

Plot 
With summer approaching, 16-year-old América has two issues, or so she thinks. She hates school and her aunt Carolina's alcoholic husband, Joey. She passes the days shoplifting, hanging out with her friends and trying to avoid Joey.

After a life-changing event, América, whose Spanish is limited, is sent to Buenos Aires, Argentina to live with her reclusive and anti-American grandmother, Lucía América Campos. In Argentina, América struggles to find her place with a grandmother she has never known and to hold onto a friendship with Sergio, a neighbor twice her age.

Cast 
Kristen Gonzalez as América
Ana Maria Colombo as Lucia
Nicolás Meradi as Sergio
Gy Mirano as Carolina
Gilberto Arribas as Joey

Festivals/Exhibitions 
 The film premiered on October 11, 2007, at the Woodstock Film Festival.
 Ola Latin American Film Festival, Orlando, Florida, February 2008
 12th Annual Harlem Stage on Screen: Creatively Speaking Film Series, March 2008
 Tiburon International Film Festival, Tiburon, CA, March 2008
 XXVI Festival Cinematográfico Internacional del Uruguay, Montevideo, April 2008
 11th Cine Las Americas International Film Festival, April 2008
 Reel Rasquache Film Festival, California State University, Los Angeles, June 2008
 Brooklyn Academy of Music Film Screening Series, April 2008
 Museum of Fine Arts (Boston), May 2008
 New York International Latino Film Festival, July 2008
 Hartford International Film Festival, November 2008
 Yale University, January 2009

Home media 
3 Américas was released on DVD in the US by Vanguard International Cinema on January 26, 2010.

References

External links 
 
 
 Wild Wimmin Films Site
 The Independent Review of 3 Américas
 WAMC Public Radio Interview 
 3 Américas on Indiewire 
 Indiepix Interview with Cristina Kotz Cornejo

Argentine drama films
2007 films
2000s Spanish-language films
Films scored by Germaine Franco
2000s Argentine films